Lew Sip Hon (27 June 1925 – 7 June 2016) was a Malaysian politician and former vice president of the MCA. He was also a Member of Parliament for Shah Alam (1974-1986) and Deputy Minister of Trade and Industry of Malaysia. Other positions he has held include Ambassador of Malaysia to the United States, Chairman of the Council of the UTAR College.

Political career
Lew first ran for parliamentary seat of Bangsar but lost. He was successfully ran for MP of Shah Alam in 1974 and was subsequently appointed as Parliamentary Secretary to the Ministry of Primary Industries in 1976, Lew was promoted to Deputy Minister of Trade and Industry in 1978, however he resigned as Deputy Minister of Trade and Industry in 1983, but he retained his post in MCA and MP of Shah Alam. 

Lew later served as Ambassador of Malaysia to the United States from January 1984 to January 1986.

Election Results

Personal life
Lew was married to Datin Goh Min Check. Goh died on 10 January 2015.

Lew died on 7 June 2016 in the age 90.

Honours
 :
 Officer of the Order of the Defender of the Realm (KMN) (1962)
 :
 Companion of the Order of the Defender of the Realm (JMN) (1976)
 :
 Knight Commander of the Order of the Crown of Selangor (DPMS) – Dato' (1978)

References

People from Perak
Malaysian politicians of Chinese descent
Malaysian Chinese Association politicians
Members of the Dewan Rakyat
Officers of the Order of the Defender of the Realm
Companions of the Order of the Defender of the Realm
Knights Commander of the Order of the Crown of Selangor
1925 births
2016 deaths